Erzsebet Palatinus is a Yugoslav table tennis player of Hungarian descent who competed in the 1979 World Table Tennis Championships in Pyongyang, where she won the bronze medal in women's doubles, together with Gordana Perkučin.

References

External links
 Table Tennis statistics of Palatinus

Living people
Yugoslav table tennis players
Serbian female table tennis players
Serbian people of Hungarian descent
Year of birth missing (living people)
People from Čoka